Edmonton North was a provincial electoral district in Alberta, Canada, mandated to return a single member to the Legislative Assembly of Alberta using the first past the post method of voting from 1959 to 1971.

History
The Edmonton North electoral district was in the 1959 redistribution which broke up the mega-ridings of Edmonton and Calgary, creating a number of single-member districts in their place. The district was redistributed into Edmonton-Calder and Edmonton-Kingsway electoral districts in 1971.

Members of the Legislative Assembly (MLAs)

Election results

1959 general election

1963 general election

1967 general election

See also
List of Alberta provincial electoral districts

References

Further reading

External links
Elections Alberta
The Legislative Assembly of Alberta

Former provincial electoral districts of Alberta
Politics of Edmonton